Le Verger is a commune in the Ille-et-Vilaine department of Brittany in northwestern France.

Population
Inhabitants of Le Verger are called Vergéens in French.

International relations
There is a partnership arrangement with the German community of Hahn am See.

See also
Communes of the Ille-et-Vilaine department

References

External links

Official website Le Verger 
Mayors of Ille-et-Vilaine Association 

Communes of Ille-et-Vilaine